The Estancia Basin is an endorheic basin located in north-central New Mexico.  The watershed covers portions of Santa Fe, Bernalillo, Torrance, and Lincoln counties.  It has a total area of 2400 square miles.

External links
 Hydologic Modeling of the Estancia Basin, New Mexico

Geography of New Mexico
Geography of Santa Fe County, New Mexico
Geography of Bernalillo County, New Mexico
Geography of Torrance County, New Mexico
Geography of Lincoln County, New Mexico